The 1989–90 Primera División de Fútbol Profesional season is the 38th tournament of El Salvador's Primera División since its establishment of the National League system in 1948. The tournament was scheduled to end in, 1990. Alianza FC, the best regular season team, won the championship match against Luis Angel Firpo, the best team in the final group.

Teams

Managerial changes

During the season

League standings

Final round standings

Final

Top scorers

List of foreign players in the league
This is a list of foreign players in 1989-1990. The following players:
have played at least one apetura game for the respective club.
have not been capped for the El Salvador national football team on any level, independently from the birthplace

Acajutla
 

C.D. Águila
 

Alianza F.C.
  Carlos Solar
  Raul Toro
  Gustavo Faral
  Julio da Rosa

Atletico Marte
 

Chalatenango
 

 (player released mid season)
  (player Injured mid season)
 Injury replacement player

Cojutepeque
  Salvador Filho
  Frank Lozada
  Percival Piggott
  Ruben Guevara

Dragon
 

C.D. FAS
  Carlos Alvarez
  Hector Cedres
  Eduardo Rinaldi

C.D. Luis Ángel Firpo
  Toninho Dos Santos
  Nildeson
  Fernando de Moura
  Julio César Chávez

Metapan

External links
 
 
 
 

1988